The 41st South American Swimming Championships were held March 11–25, 2012 in Belem, Brazil.

Participating countries
Countries which sent teams were:

Results

Men

Women

Medal standings
Final medal standings for the 2012 South American Swimming Championships are:

External links 
 2012 South American Swimming Champs Results

South American Swimming Championships
South American Swimming Championships
South American Swimming Championships
Swimming competitions in Brazil
International sports competitions hosted by Brazil
Sport in Belém
South American Swimming Championships